These are the results for the boys' singles event at the 2014 Summer Youth Olympics.

Kamil Majchrzak of Poland won the gold medal, defeating Orlando Luz of Brazil in the gold medal match 6–4, 7–5.

Andrey Rublev of Russia won the bronze medal, defeating Jumpei Yamasaki of Japan in the Bronze medal match 6–1, 6–3.

Seeds

Main draw

Finals

Top half

Bottom half

References 
 Main draw

Boys' singles